World War Hulk: X-Men is a three-issue mini-series published by Marvel comics. It ties in with the World War Hulk story arc and concerns Professor Xavier's role in the Illuminati and the Hulk's exile into space. Xavier was absent when the Illuminati decided to send the Hulk away and so the Hulk comes to the X-Mansion seeking to be enlightened by Xavier on what he would have decided had he been present. On a side note, this part of the World War Hulk storyline took place before, during, and after Endangered Species.

Synopsis
Issue One:
After making his announcement over Manhattan, the Hulk arrives at the Xavier Institute for Higher Learning. He states that he wants to see Professor X, but Beast refuses and a fight begins. The New X-Men—consisting of Surge, Hellion, Mercury, Dust, Rockslide, Elixir and X-23—battle the Hulk; The Hulk soundly defeats them and then the Astonishing X-Men arrive. Professor X finally arrives and the Hulk asks him how he would've voted had he been present when Iron Man, Mister Fantastic, Doctor Strange and Black Bolt decided to shoot him into space. 

Issue Two:
Professor X telepathically scans the Hulk's mind and so witnesses all that he endured in interplanetary exile and is humbled. Xavier admits that he wouldn't have agreed to shoot the Hulk into space permanently, but would've sent him there while the Illuminati searched for a cure. Acknowledging this as well as other mistakes that have hurt his X-Men in the past, Xavier surrenders to the Hulk willingly, but the gathered Astonishing X-Men refuse to give him up without a fight. A second fight breaks out with Cyclops, Emma Frost, Wolverine, Beast, Shadowcat, Colossus and Lockheed against the Hulk. Again like in the previous issue Hulk defeats each member of the team. Seeing this from a distance, The Stepford Cuckoos telepathically call out to the other X-Teams for help. In London, Excalibur hear the call, but realize they are powerless to help based on distance alone. Xavier's stepbrother, Cain Marko—the Juggernaut—asks Cyttorak via his gem to teleport him fully powered to Westchester to battle the Hulk. Cain arrives at the field of battle, but without his full power and is easily defeated. Then X-Factor Investigations and the Uncanny X-Men arrive. 

Issue Three:
A third fight breaks out with Nightcrawler, Warpath, Hepzibah, Darwin, Multiple Man, Wolfsbane, Siryn, Monet and Strong Guy against the Hulk (with the help of members of the other teams). Several attempts are made to stop the Hulk, among them physical assault, sonic attack, letting the X-Jet drop on him, but all fail. The Juggernaut manages to regain his full power after Cyttorak gets Cain to admit that he wants to fight the Hulk and not save his step-brother. He matches the Hulk blow-for-blow, but the Hulk uses Juggernaut's own strength and unstoppable momentum against him. When all the X-Men are defeated, the Hulk enters the school and again attempts to take Professor X before The Juggernaut can return. Mercury tries to stop the Hulk, but is easily thrown aside into the mansion's grave yard. Mercury then reasons with the Hulk, telling him about the events of M-Day and saying that they understand his hurt and anger on the basis of their own suffering as mutants. Hulk relents and leaves without the Professor, reasoning that Xavier himself is in his own hell based on his own mistakes and that the X-Men have already suffered too much already. While the X-Men tend to the wounded, Cyclops finally forgives Professor X for not telling him about Vulcan and Juggernaut takes his leave advising that the X-Men don't go after him.

Publication History
 June - World War Hulk: X-Men #1
 July - World War Hulk: X-Men #2
 August - World War Hulk: X-Men #3

See also
 Planet Hulk
 World War Hulk
 The Illuminati in World War Hulk
 Gamma Corps

References

Comics articles that need to differentiate between fact and fiction
2007 comics debuts
Hulk (comics) titles
Comics by Christos Gage